The She Rockers were a female hip hop group from London, featuring Donna 'She Roc' McConnell, Antonia 'MC Aurra' Jolly, Dupe Fagbesa and Alison Clarkson (who later found fame as Betty Boo).

Career
She Rockers' first release - as a trio of McConnell, Fagbesa and Clarkson - was a track on the Known 2 Be Down compilation of UK hip hop artists from West London. "Give It A Rest", the band's only single as a trio, followed on the Music of Life label, and was produced by Public Enemy's Professor Griff after the She Rockers performed an impromptu rap to Public Enemy at their local McDonald's in Shepherd's Bush, London; She Rockers also supported Public Enemy in the US. They later toured with De La Soul.

Clarkson and Fagbesa departed from the group in 1989, and founding member McConnell then joined forces with original band member Antonia Jolly (Aurra), and landed a recording contract with Jive Records, releasing several singles including "Jam It Jam", and an album, Rockers from London (Jive, 1990). Rockers From London showcased a move towards the contemporary hip house style, was part written and produced by Todd Terry and featured productions by Technotronic and Double Trouble. "Jam It Jam" reached #58 in the UK Singles Chart in January 1990. 

In addition to She Rockers, MC Aurra recorded with Rhythm King artists Bomb The Bass and Merlin, Aurra and Clarkson - as Hit and Run - released a single on Rap Sonic records and Clarkson featured on Beatmasters single "Hey DJ/I Can't Dance To That Music You're Playing" before leaving for a successful solo career, which led Music Of Life to release a Simon Harris remix of "Give It A Rest" billed as She Rockers Featuring Betty Boo.

Discography

Albums
 Rockers from London (Jive, 1990)

Singles

Selected compilation appearances
"First Impressions" on Known 2 Be Down (Positive Beat, 1987)
"Give It A Rest" on Hard As Hell Vol. 3 (Music Of Life, 1988)

References

English girl groups
English hip hop groups
Women hip hop groups
British hip hop girl groups
British musical trios
Musical groups from London
Black_British_women_rappers
Jive Records artists
Rhythm King artists
Hip house music groups